Lincoln County is a county located in the U.S. state of Mississippi. As of the 2020 census, the population was 34,907. Its county seat is Brookhaven.

The county was created by the legislature on April 7, 1870, during the Reconstruction Era. It was formed from portions of Lawrence, Pike, Franklin, Copiah, and Amite counties. It was named for Abraham Lincoln, the 16th President of the United States.

Lincoln County comprises the Brookhaven, MS Micropolitan Statistical Area, which is included in the Jackson–Vicksburg–Brookhaven Combined Statistical Area. The county is southwest of the state capital of Jackson.

Geography

Major highways
  Interstate 55
  U.S. Highway 51
  U.S. Highway 84

Adjacent counties
 Copiah County (north)
 Lawrence County (east)
 Walthall County (southeast)
 Pike County (south)
 Amite County (southwest)
 Franklin County (west)
 Jefferson County (northwest)

National protected area
 Homochitto National Forest (part), supervised by the United States Forestry Service of the U.S. Department of Agriculture.

Demographics

2020 census

As of the 2020 United States census, there were 34,907 people, 12,699 households, and 9,054 families residing in the county.

2000 census
As of the United States Census of 2000, (which precedes the large changes and increases reflected in the figures, resulting from the substantial annexations and tripling of the size of the City of Brookhaven, the county seat, from late 2007, which would be reflected in the newer United States Census of 2010)—there were 33,166 people, 12,538 households, and 9,190 families residing in the county. The population density was 57 people per square mile (22/km2). There were 14,052 housing units at an average density of 24 per square mile (9/km2). The racial makeup of the county was 69.38% White, 29.67% Black or African American, 0.17% Native American, 0.24% Asian, 0.01% Pacific Islander, 0.16% from other races, and 0.37% from two or more races. 0.69% of the population were Hispanic or Latino of any race.

There were 12,538 households, out of which 34.90% had children under the age of 18 living with them, 54.90% were married couples living together, 14.70% had a female householder with no husband present, and 26.70% were non-families. 24.40% of all households were made up of individuals, and 11.50% had someone living alone who was 65 years of age or older. The average household size was 2.59 and the average family size was 3.08.

In the county, the population was spread out, with 26.70% under the age of 18, 9.50% from 18 to 24, 27.60% from 25 to 44, 22.30% from 45 to 64, and 13.90% who were 65 years of age or older. The median age was 36 years. For every 100 females there were 92.20 males. For every 100 females age 18 and over, there were 88.60 males.

The median income for a household in the county was $27,279, and the median income for a family was $33,552. Males had a median income of $29,060 versus $18,877 for females. The per capita income for the county was $13,961. About 16.00% of families and 19.20% of the population were below the poverty line, including 22.80% of those under age 18 and 17.10% of those age 65 or over.

The offices of president and vice-president on the county supervisors rotate annually.

This county does not have "home rule;" thus, the legislature reserved to itself power over the county. Its representatives and state senators help serve its residents.

Economy
The telecommunications company MCI Worldcom was located in Lincoln County. Its Chief Executive Officer (CEO) and founder Bernard Ebbers resided near Brookhaven prior to his conviction; he was sentenced to prison.

Education

The county is served by two separate public school districts, a private school, and a couple of smaller "Christian" or religious/private  schools. The Lincoln County Public School District consists of four K–12 schools of elementary, middle school, and high school levels. These include Loyd Star hornets, Bogue Chitto bobcats, West Lincoln bears and Enterprise wasps. Through annexations, the City tripled its size in 2007. As well a Brookhaven Academy cougars which is a part of the MAPS or MAIS.

Media
Lincoln County is served by the local newspaper Daily Leader, printed daily except Monday and Saturday. Residents may also purchase the larger daily newspaper from the state capital of Jackson, The Clarion-Ledger, which serves the central state metropolitan area and the entire State of Mississippi.

Communities

City
 Brookhaven (county seat)

Town
 Wesson (partly located in Copiah County)

Hamlets
 Bogue Chitto

Unincorporated communities
 Auburn
 Caseyville
 East Lincoln
 Norfield
 Ruth

Ghost towns
 Woolworth

See also
 National Register of Historic Places listings in Lincoln County, Mississippi

References

External links
 Lincoln County
 Lincoln County Sheriff's Office

 
Mississippi counties
1870 establishments in Mississippi
Populated places established in 1870